Hötorget, formerly known as Kungsgatan, is an underground station on the Green line of the Stockholm metro. The station has three entrances, one at each end and one in the middle from Kungsgatan. The central entrance includes an underground square with several shops and stores.

The station was inaugurated on 26 October 1952 as the east terminus of the stretch between Hötorget and Vällingby. The line was extended to Slussen on 24 November 1957, thereby connecting west and east sections of the green line. It was called Kungsgatan until 1957. The name was changed to Hötorget when the southern and western tracks were joined as one (by the opening of the stations T-centralen and Gamla Stan through the central city).

The station's original 1950s signage and decor have been deliberately retained. As part of Art in the Stockholm metro project, 103 white neon strips have been installed in the platform ceiling.

Gallery

References

External links
Images of Hötorget

Green line (Stockholm metro) stations
Railway stations opened in 1952